Teutonia is a genus of arachnids belonging to the family Teutoniidae.

The genus was described in 1889 by Koenike.

The species of this genus are found in Europe.

Species:
 Teutonia cometes (Koch, 1837)
 Teutonia lunata Marshall, 1924

References

Trombidiformes